In mathematics, the Rothe–Hagen identity is a mathematical identity valid for all complex numbers except where its denominators vanish:

It is a generalization of Vandermonde's identity, and is named after Heinrich August Rothe and Johann Georg Hagen.

References
.
. See especially pp. 89–91.
.
.
.

Factorial and binomial topics
Mathematical identities
Complex analysis